The name Kampong Menengah may refer to:
 Kampong Menengah, village in Mukim Bangar, Temburong District, Brunei
 Kampong Menengah, village in Mukim Lamunin, Tutong District, Brunei